Maidhc Dainín Ó Sé (2 February 1942 – 29 August 2013) was an Irish-language writer and musician from the County Kerry Gaeltacht. He was the father of Dáithí Ó Sé. He was one of the best known Irish writers of his generation, noted for his autobiography A Thig Ná Tit Orm. His writings were used as part of the Irish-language element of the Leaving Certificate in Irish state education, as a replacement for Peig from 1995.

Biography
Born in Carrachán, Baile na nGall, County Kerry in 1942, Maidhc Dainín was the son of  a fisherman from Baile na nGall called Dainín Dan Ó Sé and his wife from an Daingean, Máire Ní Chinnéide. In 1958 at the age of 16, Maidhc moved to England for a while, before moving to Chicago, United States in 1959. He returned to Ireland in 1969.

Writings

Autobiography
 A Thig Ná Tit Orm ("House Don't Fall on Me"; Baile Átha Cliath: Coiscéim 1987)

Fiction
 Corcán na dTrí gCos (Baile Átha Cliath: Coiscéim 1988)
 Tae le tae (Baile Átha Cliath: Coiscéim 1990)
 Chicago driver (Baile Átha Cliath: Coiscéim 1992)
 Dochtúir na bPiast (Baile Átha Cliath: Coiscéim 1993)
 Greenhorn (Baile Átha Cliath: Coiscéim 1997)
 Madraí na nocht gcos (Baile Atha Cliath: Coisceim 1998)
 Mair, a chapaill (Baile Átha Cliath: Coiscéim 1999)
 Idir dhá lios (Baile Átha Cliath: Coiscéim 2005)
 Is glas iad na cnoic (Baile Átha Cliath: Coiscéim 1997)
 Lilí Frainc (Baile Átha Cliath: Coiscéim 2001)
 Mura mBuafam - Suatham (Baile Átha Cliath: Coisceim 2003)
 Nuadha agus Breoghan ar neamh (Baile Átha Cliath: Coisceim 2006)
 Binn Éadair (Baile Átha Cliath: Coiscéim 2006)
 Seán Óg Máirtín (Baile Átha Cliath: Coiscéim 2007)
 Lucinda Sly: úrscéal stairiúil (Baile Átha Cliath: Coiscéim 2008)
 Cara go brách: Úrscéal (Baile Átha Cliath: Coiscéim 2010)

Poetry
 Citeal na stoirme (Baile Átha Cliath: Coiscéim 1991)

Music
 Ó Chicago go Carrachán (Cló Iar-Chonnacht 1999)
 Ó Thuaidh - Traditional Song and Music from West Kerry

External links
 Death of Kerry musician and author of ‘A Thig Ná Tit Orm’, Maidhc Dainín Ó Sé at The Journal
 Author and language enthusiast Ó Sé dies at Irish Examiner
 Maidhc Dainín Ó Sé at Musical Traditions

1942 births
2013 deaths
20th-century Irish musicians
20th-century Irish writers
21st-century Irish writers
21st-century Irish male writers
People from the Dingle Peninsula
Irish-language writers
Musicians from County Kerry